Leap Years is a 2001 drama television series that aired on the Showtime cable network. The show was created by Ron Cowen and Daniel Lipman, who had created the American version of the series Queer as Folk. It followed a group of friends in New York City. Set in the main in 2001, the show was uniquely structured as a series of flashbacks to 1993 and flashforwards to the then-near future 2008.

References

External links
 

2001 American television series debuts
2002 American television series endings
2000s American LGBT-related drama television series
Showtime (TV network) original programming
Television series by CBS Studios
Television series by MGM Television
English-language television shows
Television series set in 1993
Television series set in 2001
Television series set in 2008
Television shows set in New York City